The San Juan volcanic field is part of the San Juan Mountains  in southwestern Colorado. It consists mainly of volcanic rocks that form the largest remnant of a major composite volcanic field that covered most of the southern Rocky Mountains in the Middle Tertiary geologic time. There are approximately fifteen calderas known in the San Juan Volcanic Fields; however, it is possible that there are two or even three more in the region. 

The region began with many composite volcanoes that became active between 35 and 40 million years ago, with peak activity in the time period around 35-30 million years ago. Around this time the activity began to include explosive ash-flow eruptions. Many of these volcanoes experienced caldera collapse, resulting in the fifteen to eighteen caldera volcanoes in the region today.

Phases of Volcanism 
The San Juan volcanic field experienced two phases of volcanism.

The earlier volcanism took place during the Oligocene age of the Paleogene Period. It produced largely intermediate composition lavas and breccias, together with ash flow tuffs reflecting differentiation of the original magma. The precaldera intermediate volcanic rocks include the Conejos Formation in the southeastern part of the field. Intermediate volcanism did not cease with caldera eruptions, and included such voluminous intermediate volcanic rocks as the Huerto Andesite.

The later volcanism took place from Miocene to Pliocene in ages of the Neogene Period. It was characterized by bimodal volcanism, producing both low-silica alkaline flows and high-silica rhyolites. It is usually interpreted as a partial melt of the lower crust that was erupted onto the surface.

Notable calderas

Economic Impact 
The San Juan volcanic field has been a historically important mining district, producing lead, zinc, copper, gold, and
silver. The ores were mostly deposited in and near calderas that experienced significant postcaldera activity. Ore veins were concentrated in fractures associated with caldera activity and in postcaldera intrusive bodies. The greatest mineralization took place near the youngest and most silicic intrusions of each caldera cycle.

See also 
 List of large volume volcanic eruptions in the Basin and Range Province

References 

Volcanic fields of Colorado
San Juan Mountains (Colorado)
Extinct volcanoes
Geology of the Rocky Mountains
Landforms of Mineral County, Colorado
Oligocene volcanism
Miocene volcanism
Pliocene volcanism
Oligocene North America
Miocene North America
Pliocene North America
Geologic formations of Colorado
Neogene Colorado
Paleogene Colorado
Calderas of Colorado
Oligocene calderas